Rachel Grace Bloznalis (born May 25, 1995) is an American soccer player who plays for Djurgårdens in the Swedish Damallsvenskan.

Early life

New England Football Club
Bloznalis played youth soccer for New England Football Club from U10 until U18.

Boston University
Bloznalis joined the Boston University Terriers as a freshman in 2013. In her freshman year, Bloznalis played in 18 games as part of a defense responsible for shutting out 16 opponents. As a sophomore she started in two games before suffering a season-ending injury. As a junior she started in 19 games and finished with two goals and four assists and was named to the 2015 All-Patriot League First Team. In her senior year as captain she started all 21 games, finished the season with 3 goals and was named Patriot League Defender of the Year and United Soccer Coaches All-Region First Team. In November of her senior season the NCAA granted her a fifth year of eligibility for the 2018 season as Bloznalis pursued her Master's degree in Public Health.  In her graduate season as captain Bloznalis was once again named Patriot League Defender of the Year, All-Patriot League First Team as well as United Soccer Coaches All-East Region First Team. She was also named to the MAC Hermann Trophy Watch List.

In 2018, Bloznalis was selected as the Boston University Woman of the Year, which honors the female student-athlete who best exemplifies a commitment to service, leadership, athletics and academics during her collegiate career.

Professional career
Bloznalis signed for Elitettan side Umeå IK in February 2018. Bloznalis started in 51 of 52 matches during her two seasons in Umeå leading the team with minutes played. In her second year with Umeå IK, Bloznalis led the side to a first place finish in the 2019 Elitettan standings and subsequent promotion to Damallsvenskan.
In November 2019, Bloznalis signed with Swedish Damallsvenskan team Djurgårdens IF.
In September 2020, Bloznalis signed a two year extension with Swedish Damallsvenskan team Djurgårdens IF.

International career
In August 2018, Bloznalis was selected to the US U23 Women's National Team. During this stint Bloznalis helped lead the team to a first place finish in the 2018 Nordic Tournament.

Honors and awards

League
Elitettan Champions (2019)

Individual
Patriot League Defender of the Year (2016, 2017)
All-Patriot League First Team (2015, 2016, 2017)
Academic All-Patriot League (2016, 2017)
Senior CLASS Award Candidate (2016, 2017) 
MAC Hermann Trophy Watch List (2017)
United Soccer Coaches Scholar All-American (2016,2017) 
United Soccer Coaches All-East Region First Team (2017)
United Soccer Coaches First Team Scholar All-East Region (2017)
All-ECAC First Team (2017)
New England Soccer Journal Defender of the Year (2017)
NSCAA All-Region First Team (2016)
Patriot League Academic Honor Roll (2014, 2015, 2016)
Patriot League Preseason Defender of the Year (2016, 2017)

References

1995 births
Living people
People from Upton, Massachusetts
Sportspeople from Worcester County, Massachusetts
Soccer players from Massachusetts
American women's soccer players
Boston University Terriers women's soccer players
Umeå IK players
Djurgårdens IF Fotboll (women) players
Damallsvenskan players
American expatriate women's soccer players
American expatriate sportspeople in Sweden
Expatriate women's footballers in Sweden
American sportspeople of Haitian descent
Women's association football defenders